Justin Phillips (born April 24, 1985 in Ottawa, Ontario) is a Canadian football linebacker who is currently a free agent. He was drafted with the fifth overall pick in the 2007 CFL Draft by the Calgary Stampeders. He played CIS Football with Wilfrid Laurier University.

External links
Ottawa Redblacks bio

1985 births
Living people
Calgary Stampeders players
Canadian football linebackers
Canadian football people from Ottawa
Ottawa Redblacks players
Players of Canadian football from Ontario
Wilfrid Laurier Golden Hawks football players